The Ministry of Climate and Environment is a ministry in the Polish government, established on .  It is headed by Anna Moskwa, who has held the position of Minister of Climate and Environment since .  The ministry is also responsible for energy, forestry, and water management.

The ministry was created by merging the water management department of the Ministry of Marine Economy and Inland Navigation and the environment department of the Ministry of Environment into the former .

List of ministers

Notes

References

External links 
 Official site on gov.pl

2020 establishments in Poland
Climate change in Europe
Climate change ministries
Energy in Poland
Poland, Climate and Environment
Environment of Poland
Poland, Climate and Environment
Climate and Environment
Poland, Climate and Environment
Ministries established in 2020